Pappus's theorem  may refer to:

Pappus's area theorem
Pappus's centroid theorem
Pappus's hexagon theorem